Futsal Canadian Championship is the futsal year end national club competition hosted by Canada Soccer. Its first year featured two clubs from Quebec and Ontario in 2015. The competition is under the authority of the Canada Soccer Association and adheres to the FIFA Futsal Laws Of The Game.

The inaugural season was played in 2015 at Centre d'éducatif des adultes Outremont with only two clubs participating: Futsal Club Toronto and Albiceleste. The most recent edition featured eight clubs in 2019 and was won by Toronto Idolo, who are the most successful club in the competition's history. The 2020 and 2021 tournaments were cancelled due to the COVID-19 pandemic.

The 2016 tournament was held at the University of Ontario Institute of Technology while the 2017-2019 editions were held at the Athletic Recreation Complex at Queen's University in Kingston. 

Assistant Canadian Men's National Futsal Coach, Lorenzo Redwood, is the most successful coach in the competition, having won three national titles, 2016 with Toronto United Futsal, and in 2018 and 2019 with Toronto Idolo.

Since 2017, matches have been broadcast internationally via Canada Soccer's YouTube channel.

Participating clubs have come from Yukon, Alberta, Nunavut, Saskatchewan, Manitoba, Ontario, and Quebec.

Champions
 2015: Futsal Club Toronto
 2016: Toronto United Futsal
 2017: Sporting de Montréal
 2018: Toronto Idolo Futsal
 2019: Toronto Idolo Futsal
 2020: Cancelled due to COVID-19
 2021: Cancelled due to COVID-19
 2022: Sporting de Montreal

Top goalscorers

See also

 Canada men's national futsal team
 Canada men's national soccer team
 Soccer in Canada

References

External links 
Futsal Canadian Championship 

Futsal competitions in Canada
Sports leagues established in 2015
2015 establishments in Canada
Professional sports leagues in Canada